A Volksgarten (meaning "folks' park") is a public park founded by the nation in Germany or Austria, and may refer to:

 Volksgarten, Vienna in Austria
 Volksgarten, Salzburg in Austria
 Volksgarten, Munich in Germany
 Volksgarten, Düsseldorf in Germany
 Volksgarten, Cologne in Germany
 Volksgarten, Mönchengladbach in Germany
 Düsseldorf Volksgarten station in Germany

de:Volksgarten